Henze is a German surname. Notable people with the surname include:

Albert Henze (1894–1979), German Wehrmacht general
Frank Henze (born 1977), German slalom canoeist
Gertrud Henze (1901–2014), a German supercentenarian
Hans Werner Henze (1926–2012), German composer
Jürgen Henze (born 1950), East German slalom canoeist
Leon Henze (born 1992), German footballer
Martin Henze (born 1981), a German astronomer and namesake of minor planet 6642 Henze
 Martin Henze, a German chemist who first discovered vanadium-containing proteins known as vanabins in 1911
Matthias Henze, the Isla Carroll and Perry E. Turner Professor of Hebrew Bible and Early Judaism at Rice University in Houston
Richard Henze (1895–1985), a highly decorated Oberst of the Reserves in the Wehrmacht during World War II
Stefan Henze (1981–2016), German slalom canoeist

See also
6642 Henze, a minor planet named for German astronomer Martin Henze
Henze Boekhout (born 1947), a Dutch artist/photographer

German-language surnames